The Better Angels is a 2014 American biographical historical drama film about United States President Abraham Lincoln's formative years. It was written and directed by A. J. Edwards and produced by Terrence Malick.

The film had its premiere at 2014 Sundance Film Festival on January 18, 2014. It was subsequently screened in the Panorama program at the 64th Berlin International Film Festival on February 8, 2014.

In March 2014, Amplify acquired distribution rights to the film. It was released on November 7, 2014.

Synopsis and background
This film serves as a story of Abraham Lincoln's childhood, his upbringing in Indiana, and the hardships and tragedies that made him the man he was. Lincoln lived more than thirteen years in Indiana, but the film focuses on his life from ages eight to eleven or twelve (years 1817 to 1821), and explores Lincoln's relationships between Lincoln and his birth mother and his stepmother. Lincoln historian and scholar William Bartelt served as a historical consultant for the film with Bartelt's 2008 book There I Grew Up: Remembering Abraham Lincoln's Indiana Youth providing substantial inspiration to the filmmakers. The title of the film, "The Better Angels," is borrowed from the final words of Abraham Lincoln's first inaugural address, "the better angels of our nature."

Cast
 Diane Kruger as Sarah Lincoln
 Jason Clarke as Thomas Lincoln
 Brit Marling as Nancy Lincoln
 Wes Bentley as Mr. Crawford
 Braydon Denney as Abe (Young Abraham Lincoln)
Cameron Mitchell Williams as Dennis Hanks

Reception
The Better Angels received mixed reviews from critics. Todd McCarthy of The Hollywood Reporter gave the film a positive review, saying it's "a beautiful, arty, very Malick-influenced evocation of Abraham Lincoln's childhood." Katie Hasty  of HitFix praised the film by saying it is "a lushly conceived, exhaustively realized debut feature that'd be pretty formidable stuff coming from a more practised filmmaker — and derided in some quarters as a self-impressed knock-off." Rodrigo Perez in his Indiewire review said the movie focuses "on mood, nature, divinity and celestial atmosphere" rather than story.

Review aggregation website Rotten Tomatoes gives the film an approval rating of 45%, based on reviews from 49 critics with an average score of 5.88/10. The website's critics' consensus reads: "Malick-inspired but not as inspired as Malick, The Better Angels muffles an interesting idea under ponderous execution."

See also
Early life and career of Abraham Lincoln

References

External links
 
 
 The Better Angels

2014 films
2014 biographical drama films
American biographical drama films
Films about Abraham Lincoln
Films set in 1817
Films set in 1818
Films set in 1819
Films set in 1820
Films set in 1821
Films set in Indiana
2014 directorial debut films
2014 drama films
2010s English-language films
2010s American films